Little Birdy is the debut EP by Australian indie rock band Little Birdy. The EP was co-produced by Little Birdy with Andy Lawson, Joel Quartermain, and Rodney Aravena from Perth's Debaser Studios. It was released after their 2003 Kiss My WAMi win for "Best New Band" and "Best Female Vocalist", and just in time to coincide with East Coast appearances at Livid.

"Relapse" which reached the number 1 most requested song on Triple J's Net 50. and number 16 on the Triple J Hottest 100, with "Baby Blue" coming in at number 25. The EP reached a peak of number 27 on the Australian ARIA Singles Charts. "I Should Have Known" (originally packaged under the name "I Should of Known") was later re-recorded as "Andy Warhol" for their debut album BigBigLove, as was "Relapse".

Track listing

Charts

References

2003 debut EPs
Little Birdy albums